Simon Garlick (born 10 April 1975) is a former Australian rules footballer who played between 1994 and 2004, and current football administrator.

Drafted to Sydney Swans with the 49th selection in the 1993 AFL draft, he spent his first four years of league football with Sydney, before moving over to the Western Bulldogs. He played over 100 games for the Bulldogs before announcing his retirement during the 2004 season.

In December 2010, Garlick was appointed CEO of the Western Bulldogs and maintained that position for four years. He then served as CEO of Bastion Collective until being appointed CEO of the Fremantle Football Club in October 2019.

References

External links

Living people
Australian rules footballers from Victoria (Australia)
Sydney Swans players
Western Bulldogs players
1975 births
People educated at St Kevin's College, Melbourne
Sandringham Dragons players
Western Bulldogs administrators
Fremantle Football Club administrators